Malocchio is the third and final studio album by Canadian electronicore band, Abandon All Ships released on February 11, 2014 via Rise, Velocity, and Universal Music Canada labels.

Background
The band has so far released two out of three studio updates made during the development of the album, the first entitled, "Traces" was released on September 4, 2013, and the second, "Disposition" released on November 8, 2013. This is the band's first release with new drummer Melvin Murray and the second with guitarist Kyler Browne. The album's first single, "Reefer Madness" was released on December 20, 2013 and showcases Sebastian Cassisi-Nunez incorporation of EDM. On January 24, 2014 the band released the second single from their forthcoming album, "Cowboys".

Track listing

Personnel 
Abandon All Ships
 Angelo Aita – unclean vocals
 Kyler Browne – guitar
 Martin Broda – bass guitar, clean vocals
 Melvin Murray – drums
 Sebastian Cassisi-Nunez – synthesizers, keyboards, programming, electronics

Personnel
 Anthony Calabretta – production, mixing, mastering, art direction, design, photography
 Thomas Gutches – management
 Dan Hand – management
 Adam Kreeft – booking
 Colin Lewis – booking
 Simon Paul – design, layout
 Dave Shapiro – booking
 Mark Spicoluk – production
 Marco Walzel – booking

References

Rise Records albums
2014 debut albums
Abandon All Ships albums